The 1929–30 NHL season was the 13th season of the National Hockey League. Ten teams played 44 games each. The Montreal Canadiens upset the heavily favoured Boston Bruins two games to none in the Stanley Cup Finals.

League business

The league instituted in the new rules the standard dimensions for ice hockey rinks, that of  × . The already-built Boston Garden  ×  and the soon-to-be-open Chicago Stadium  × , which were smaller were exempt from the new rule.

To combat low scoring, the off-side rules were rewritten. Players were now allowed forward passing in the offensive zone, instead of only in the defensive and neutral zones. Players were now allowed to enter the offensive zone before the puck. The only off-side rule left was that passing was not allowed from one zone to another. The changes led to abuse: players sat in front of the opposing net waiting for a pass. The rule was changed in mid-season and players were no longer allowed to enter the offensive zone before the puck.

Regular season
Cooney Weiland of the Boston Bruins took advantage of the rule changes and smashed the old NHL scoring record with 73 points. Weiland and Tiny Thompson, who won the Vezina Trophy with a 2.23 goals against average, led the Bruins to a final season standings record of 38 wins, 5 losses, and 1 tie. The Bruins set three impressive NHL records including most wins in the regular season (38), highest winning percentage (0.875), and most consecutive home ice wins (20).

The 1943–44 Montreal Canadiens and the 1944–45 Montreal Canadiens would tie the record for most wins in a season at 38. But the record remained unbroken for 21 years until March 11, 1951 when the 1950–51 Detroit Red Wings notched their 39th victory in a much longer 70-game season. The record for consecutive wins at home would stand for 82 years, being matched by the 1975–76 Philadelphia Flyers and finally surpassed on February 14, 2012 by the 2011–12 Detroit Red Wings. As of  no team has ever won 38 of their first 44 games or broken the Bruins' single season winning percentage record of 0.875.

Conn Smythe brought up two outstanding forwards, Harvey "Busher" Jackson, and Charlie Conacher, and combined with Joe Primeau, the Kid Line was born. Conacher actually scored on his first
shift in the NHL. Jackson got his nickname Busher from Tim Daly, the Toronto trainer, when
asked by Daly to assist with some sticks. "I'm a hockey player, not a stickboy," Jackson
told Daly, who replied, "Why you fresh young busher!" And it was Busher Jackson from that
day on.

After 9 games, Frank Fredrickson suffered a knee injury and the fortunes of the Pittsburgh Pirates went from bad to worse.

On January 7, 1930, Clint Benedict became the first goalie in NHL history to don a protective face mask. He did so for five games to protect a broken nose. The next time a mask made its way into the NHL was almost 30 years later when Jacques Plante wore one in a game on November 1, 1959.

Eddie Gerard resigned as manager-coach of the Montreal Maroons. He was replaced as manager by team president James Strachan. Dunc Munro was hired as coach and led the team to first place in the Canadian Division.

There was a well-founded rumour that Eddie Gerard would take the coaching reins of Ottawa from Newsy Lalonde when Lalonde was not well. Dave Gill filled in during his absence and the team did much better and made the playoffs. Gerard turned down the coaching job.

Final standings

GP = Games Played, W = Wins, L = Losses, T = Ties, Pts = Points, GF = Goals For, GA = Goals Against

Teams that qualified for the playoffs are highlighted in bold.

Playoffs

Playoff bracket

Quarterfinals

(A2) Chicago Black Hawks vs. (C2) Montreal Canadiens

(C3) Ottawa Senators vs. (A3) New York Rangers

Semifinals

(A1) Boston Bruins vs. (C1) Montreal Maroons

(C2) Montreal Canadiens vs. (A3) New York Rangers

Stanley Cup Finals

After defeating the Montreal Maroons and after having not lost consecutive games all season, the Boston Bruins were swept by the Montreal Canadiens two games to none in a best-of-three series. The first game saw Boston play way below its usual form. The Canadiens then won the Stanley Cup with a 4–3 victory in game two. The Canadiens went 5–0–1 in the playoffs, making them one of the few Stanley Cup-winning teams in history to not lose a game in the playoffs.

Awards
Nels Stewart won the Hart Trophy for the second time. Frank Boucher won the Lady Byng for the third consecutive year. Tiny Thompson won the Vezina for the first time. Thompson would go on to win the trophy four times.

Player statistics

Scoring leaders
Note: GP = Games played, G = Goals, A = Assists, PTS = Points, PIM = Penalties in minutes

Source: NHL.

Leading goaltenders
Note: GP = Games played; Mins = Minutes played; GA = Goals against; SO = Shutouts; GAA = Goals against average

Source: NHL.

Coaches

American Division
Boston Bruins: Art Ross
Chicago Black Hawks: Tom Shaughnessy and Bill Tobin
Detroit Cougars: Jack Adams
New York Rangers: Lester Patrick
Pittsburgh Pirates:Frank Frederickson

Canadian Division
Montreal Canadiens: Cecil Hart
Montreal Maroons: Dunc Munro
New York Americans: Lionel Conacher
Ottawa Senators: Newsy Lalonde
Toronto Maple Leafs: Conn Smythe

Debuts
The following is a list of players of note who played their first NHL game in 1929–30 (listed with their first team, asterisk(*) marks debut in playoffs):
Tom Cook, Chicago Black Hawks
Ebbie Goodfellow, Detroit Cougars
Syd Howe, Ottawa Senators
Busher Jackson, Toronto Maple Leafs
Charlie Conacher, Toronto Maple Leafs

Last games
The following is a list of players of note that played their last game in the NHL in 1929–30 (listed with their last team):
Mickey MacKay, Boston Bruins
Jimmy Herbert, Detroit Cougars
Clint Benedict, Montreal Maroons
Frank Nighbor, Toronto Maple Leafs

See also
1929-30 NHL Transactions
List of Stanley Cup champions
1929 in sports
1930 in sports

References
 
 
 
 
 
 

Notes

External links
Hockey Database

 
1929–30 in Canadian ice hockey by league
1929–30 in American ice hockey by league